Ahmed Gamal (born January 3, 1994) is an Egyptian professional footballer who currently plays as a defensive midfielder for the Egyptian club Smouha SC.

References

External links
Ahmed Gamal at Footballdatabase

1994 births
Living people
Egyptian footballers
Association football midfielders
Nogoom FC players
Misr Lel Makkasa SC players
Smouha SC players
Egyptian Premier League players
People from Gharbia Governorate